Bromelia goeldiana is a plant species in the genus Bromelia. This species is native to Venezuela and Brazil.

References

goeldiana
Flora of Venezuela
Flora of Brazil
Plants described in 1958